José Mário de Almeida Barros, (born 1 February 1949), commonly known as Zé Mário, is a Brazilian football manager and former player. He formerly coached the Al-Arabi Sports Club in Qatar.

Career
Zé Mário was born in Rio de Janeiro. In summer 2008, he had served his contract with Al Wasl Club after two successful seasons, where he was able to win both the UAE League, and the UAE President Cup titles in the first season (2007–08). And was able to lead them to the final of the UAE President Cup for the second consecutive year in the second season, and he has also led them in their AFC Champions League journey which ended in the group stage.

Ze Mario has then moved back to the Qatari League with his past team Al-Arabi Sports Club after failing to sign a contract with his other past team Al-Shabab (Saudi Arabia) and was fired in January 2009.

Managerial statistics

References

External links
 

1949 births
Living people
Footballers from Rio de Janeiro (city)
Brazilian footballers
Association football midfielders
Bonsucesso Futebol Clube players
CR Flamengo footballers
Fluminense FC players
CR Vasco da Gama players
Associação Portuguesa de Desportos players
Campeonato Brasileiro Série A players
Brazilian football managers
Saudi Arabia national football team managers
Botafogo de Futebol e Regatas managers
Figueirense FC managers
Ceará Sporting Club managers
Ferroviário Atlético Clube (CE) managers
Esporte Clube Flamengo managers
Goiás Esporte Clube managers
Al Ain FC managers
Clube Náutico Capibaribe managers
Al-Arabi SC (Qatar) managers
America Football Club (RJ) managers
Al Sadd SC managers
Kashima Antlers managers
Qatar national football team managers
Sport Club Internacional managers
Guarani FC managers
Al Shabab FC (Riyadh) managers
Al-Wasl F.C. managers
Campeonato Brasileiro Série A managers
J1 League managers
UAE Pro League managers
Qatar Stars League managers
Brazilian expatriate football managers
Brazilian expatriate sportspeople in Iraq
Brazilian expatriate sportspeople in the United Arab Emirates
Brazilian expatriate sportspeople in Qatar
Brazilian expatriate sportspeople in Saudi Arabia
Brazilian expatriate sportspeople in Japan
Expatriate football managers in Iraq
Expatriate football managers in the United Arab Emirates
Expatriate football managers in Qatar
Expatriate football managers in Saudi Arabia
Expatriate football managers in Japan